Samara Downs, is a British ballerina, and currently a principal dancer with the Birmingham Royal Ballet.

Samara Downs was born in Ashford, Kent. She trained at the Caroline Shaw and Pauline Kellett Dance Schools, and the Royal Ballet School.

Downs joined the Birmingham Royal Ballet in 2003, and has been a principal since 2016.

In 2018, Downs danced both lead roles, Princess Aurora and the evil fairy Carabosse, in the Sleeping Beauty.

References

British ballerinas
Living people
Birmingham Royal Ballet principal dancers
People from Ashford, Kent
People educated at the Royal Ballet School
21st-century British ballet dancers
Year of birth missing (living people)